Guillermo Vivas Valdivieso (10 February 1881 – 31 January 1965) was a Puerto Rican attorney, journalist, politician and Mayor of Ponce, Puerto Rico from 1925 to 1928.

Early years
Vivas Valdivieso was born in Ponce, Puerto Rico, on 10 February 1881. He had little formal education and starting to work at 12 years old for Olimpio Otero at his store, Bazar Otero. He later became a legal assistant for a law office, and subsequently a bookkeeper for seven years.

Journalist
At age 14, Vivas Valdivieso founded, together with Alberto Marin and Eduardo Marin, the political autonomist newspaper, La Razon. Subsequently, he also became the owner and director of the "El Día" newspaper during the time of the Ponce massacre at the hands of the Insular Police under the governorship of U.S.-appointed Gov. Blanton Winship. He had purchased the paper from its founder, Guillermo V. Cintrón, in August 1928.

Mayoral term
Vivas Valdivieso is recorded to have been the facilitator of the building of "Modern Ponce". During his administration, he secured a municipal loan of $1,250,000 ($ in  dollars) for citywide improvements that would turn the municipality of Ponce, come the administration of his successor Emilio Fagot, into the city it became during the rest of the 20th century. Some of the improvements made included the paving of so far dirt city streets, the creation of the city's sewerage system, the enlargement of the old Acueducto, the repair of rural roads, and facilitating the traffic of rural goods into the city market.<ref>Ponce: A Historical Sketch]  Juan Braschi. In, "The Book of Porto Rico. XIX: Principal Cities."]Sistema Universitario Ana G. Méndez. San Juan, Puerto Rico. Page 1069. Retrieved 4 December 2011.</ref> He is also credited with creating the first network of the city's sewer system.

Honors
He is recognized as one of Ponce's most accomplished journalists at Ponce's Park for Illustrious Ponce Citizens. In Ponce there is a street in Urbanizacion Las Delicias of Barrio Magueyes named after him.

Death
His residence was in Tercero, Ponce, but he died after six days in a hospital in Primero, Ponce, with the Puerto Rico Department of Health listing Bronchopneumonia as the cause of death.

See also

Ponce, Puerto Rico
List of Puerto Ricans

References

Further reading
 Fay Fowlie de Flores. Ponce, Perla del Sur: Una Bibliografía Anotada. Second Edition. 1997. Ponce, Puerto Rico: Universidad de Puerto Rico en Ponce. p. 216. Item 1109. 
 Cayetano Coll y Toste. Boletín Histórico de Puerto Rico. San Juan, Puerto Rico: Cantera Fernandez. 1914–1927. (Colegio Universitario Tecnológico de Ponce, CUTPO).
 Fay Fowlie de Flores. Ponce, Perla del Sur: Una Bibliografía Anotada. Second Edition. 1997. Ponce, Puerto Rico: Universidad de Puerto Rico en Ponce. p. 320. Item 1606. 
 Alquiniel. "Don Guillermo Vivas Valdivieso." Meridiano. Year 1. (Agosto 1958) pp. 12, 33, 37. (Colegio Universitario Tecnológico de Ponce, CUTPO).
 Fay Fowlie de Flores. Ponce, Perla del Sur: Una Bibliografía Anotada. Second Edition. 1997. Ponce, Puerto Rico: Universidad de Puerto Rico en Ponce. p. 109. Item 560. 
 The Representative Men of Puerto Rico. Compiled and edited by F.E. Jackson & Son. C. Frederiksen, artist and photographer. s.l.: F.E. Jackson & Son. 1901. (PUCPR; Universidad Puerto Rico - Rio Piedras, UPR).
 Fay Fowlie de Flores. Ponce, Perla del Sur: Una Bibliografía Anotada. Second Edition. 1997. Ponce, Puerto Rico: Universidad de Puerto Rico en Ponce. p. 110. Item 566. 
 Guillermo Atiles Garcia. Kaleidoscopio. Ponce, Puerto Rico: Establecimiento tipográfico de Manuel López. 1905. (Colegio Universitario Tecnológico de Ponce, CUTPO)
 Fay Fowlie de Flores. Ponce, Perla del Sur: Una Bibliografía Anotada. Second Edition. 1997. Ponce, Puerto Rico: Universidad de Puerto Rico en Ponce. p. 326. Item 1635. 
 Joaquin Monteagudo. "Al cesar como alcalde, Guillermo Vivas Valdivieso dejó en los bancos, a favor del municipio, $542,000.00 y $30,000.00 en el gobierno insular para una carretera." Helices. Vol. 3 (Febrero de 1952) pp. 14–15, 85 (UPR-Rio Piedras)
 Fay Fowlie de Flores. Ponce, Perla del Sur: Una Bibliografía Anotada. Second Edition. 1997. Ponce, Puerto Rico: Universidad de Puerto Rico en Ponce. p. 332. Item 1656. 
 Municipio de Ponce. Exposición publica a los contribuyentes y a todos los vecinos de la Ciudad de Ponce, sobre la situación económica del Municipio y sobre el estado general de todas sus dependencias y servicios, al terminar su gestión administrativa el Alcalde saliente don Guillermo Vivas Valdivieso, en enero 14 de 1929, fecha en que se hicieron cargo de la administración municipal los actuales funcionarios electos por la voluntad soberana del pueblo. San Juan, Puerto Rico: Cantero, Fernandez & Co. 1929. (Pontificia Universidad Católica de Puerto Rico)
 Fay Fowlie de Flores. Ponce, Perla del Sur: Una Bibliografía Anotada. Segunda Edición. 1997. Ponce, Puerto Rico: Universidad de Puerto Rico en Ponce. p. 339. Item 1688. 
 Guillermo Vivas Valdivieso. "A los agricultores del Distrito Municipal de Ponce, P.R." Ponce, Puerto Rico. 1926. 1 hoja. (Archivo Histórico Municipal de Ponce)
 Fay Fowlie de Flores. Ponce, Perla del Sur: Una Bibliografía Anotada. Segunda Edición. 1997. Ponce, Puerto Rico: Universidad de Puerto Rico en Ponce. p. 339. Item 1689. 
 Guillermo Vivas Valdivieso. Datos importantes de la vida municipal de la ciudad de Ponce, Puerto Rico, especialmente del periodo comprendido entre los años 1924–1928." Ponce, Puerto Rico: Talleres "El Día". 1936. (PUCPR; CUTPO [fotocopia)

Mayors of Ponce, Puerto Rico
1881 births
1965 deaths
Burials at Cementerio Católico San Vicente de Paul